Karl Friedrich Wilhelm Rohn (January 25, 1855 in Schwanheim – August 4, 1920 in Leipzig) was a German mathematician, who studied geometry.

Life and work 
Rohn studied in Darmstadt, Leipzig and Munich, initially engineering but then mathematics by the influence of Alexander von Brill, among the others. In 1878 he received a doctorate under the supervision of Felix Klein in Munich, and in 1879 he habilitated at Leipzig.
The subject of his doctoral thesis and habilitation was the Kummer surfaces of order 4 and their relationship with hyperelliptic functions (with
Riemann surfaces of genus 2). In 1884 he became an associate professor at the University of Leipzig and a year later at the Dresden University of Technology, where in 1887 he was a professor of descriptive geometry. In 1904 he became a professor at Leipzig.

In addition to the Kummer surfaces, he studied algebraic space curves and completed the classification work of Georges Halphen and Max Noether.

In 1913 he was the president of the German Mathematical Society.

Writings 
 Die verschiedenen Gestalten der Kummer'schen Fläche. In: Mathematische Annalen. 18. Band. Leipzig 1881, S. 99–159. (online)
 with Erwin Papperitz: Lehrbuch der Darstellenden Geometrie, 2 Bände, Leipzig 1893, 1896.
 with L. Berzolari: Algebraische Raumkurven und abwickelbare Flächen. In: Enzyklopädie der mathematischen Wissenschaften. Erschienen 1926. (online)

References 

The original article was a Google translation of the corresponding German article.
 
 Siegfried Gottwald, Hans J. Ilgauds, Karl-Heinz Schlote (Eds): Encyclopedia of important mathematicians. Second Edition. Harri German, Frankfurt am Main 2006, .
 Friedrich Schur: Karl Rohn Nachruf. In: Jahresbericht der Deutschen Mathematiker-Vereinigung. 32. Band, Leipzig 1923, S. 201–211

External links

19th-century German mathematicians
1855 births
1920 deaths
Technische Universität Darmstadt alumni
20th-century German mathematicians